Mango Dreams is a 2016 English-language drama film produced and directed by John Upchurch.

Plot
As a child, Dr. Amit Singh (Ram Gopal Bajaj) survived the British partition of India. Since then, he has been running forward his whole life, running from the horrors of his past — his family murdered by Muslims and the personal guilt he feels for the death of his brother. Now, with the onset of dementia, Amit must return to his childhood home and confront the memories he has been trying to forget before dementia robs him of his last chance for peace. But before the journey home begins, Amit's son Abhi (Samir Kochhar) arrives from America to commit his father to an old age home.

Amit runs away and encounters Salim (Pankaj Tripathi). Salim is a Muslim auto-rickshaw driver whose wife was raped and burned to death by Hindu rioters. Amit had earlier saved the life of Salim's son. Salim offers to drive the doctor anywhere, as a way of repaying his debt.  When Amit asks to be taken home, Salim cannot imagine how far he will end up going for the doctor or where the journey will lead them. Along the way, Amit and Salim forge an unforgettable friendship and help each other discover the peace they have been longing for.

Cast
 Ram Gopal Bajaj as Amit
 Pankaj Tripathi as Salim
 Samir Kochhar as Abhi
 Rohini Hattangadi as Padma
 S M Zaheer as Prashant
 Naseeruddin Shah as Abhay

Accolades
 2016 Arizona International Film Festival - Special Jury Award for Bridging Cultures
 2016 Cebu International Film Festival - Humanity Award (Merit Award for Best in Content)
 2016 Full Bloom Film Festival - Best Narrative Feature
 2017 London Asian Film Festival - Best Script
 2017 Calcutta International Cult Film Festival - Best Narrative Feature
 2017 Peace On Earth Film Festival - Best Narrative Feature
 2017 Dada Saheb Phalke Film Festival 
Best Film - Jury:  Mazahir Rahim, John Upchurch
Best Actor:  Ram Gopal Bajaj
Best Supporting Actor:  Pankaj Tripathi 
 2017 Telly Awards
Cinematography: Nouman Ahsan, Amit Singh
Directing: John Upchurch
 2017 filmSPARK
Best Feature: Mazahir Rahim, John Upchurch

References

External links
 

2016 films
2016 drama films
2010s Hindi-language films
Indian drama films
French drama films
Films set in Punjab, Pakistan
Films set in Punjab, India
Films set in Rajasthan
Films set in Gujarat
2016 directorial debut films
2010s English-language films
2010s French films